American country music artist Trisha Yearwood has released 15 studio albums, nine compilation albums, 43 music videos, 56 singles, 29 other charted songs and appeared on 29 albums. Yearwood's self-titled debut album was released in 1991, peaking at number 2 on the Billboard Top Country Albums chart and number 31 on the Billboard 200. It became the first debut female country album to sell one million copies, later certifying double platinum by the RIAA. The album would spawn an additional three singles, including "The Woman Before Me". Her second studio album was the critically acclaimed Hearts in Armor (1992). It spawned the top five country hits "Wrong Side of Memphis" and "Walkaway Joe". Her third studio record The Song Remembers When (1993) enjoyed similar success and the lead single reached number two on the Billboard country chart. A holiday album appeared before her platinum-selling fourth studio album Thinkin' About You (1995). Reaching the number 3 on the country albums chart and number 28 on the Billboard 200, its first two singles topped the Hot Country Singles chart. Her sixth studio album Everybody Knows (1996) spawned Yearwood's fourth number one single, "Believe Me Baby (I Lied)".

Yearwood's first compilation album (Songbook) A Collection of Hits (1997) reached the top five of the Billboard 200, topped the Top Country Albums survey, and sold over four million copies in the United States. The lead single "How Do I Live" was first included on the soundtrack of the film Con Air. The song peaked at number 2 on the Billboard chart, peaked at number 23 on the Hot 100 and was internationally successful. Her country pop-flavored seventh studio album Where Your Road Leads followed in 1998 and spawned three top ten hits, including the lead single "There Goes My Baby". Real Live Woman (2000) was a more personal project that followed, peaking in the top five of the Top Country Albums chart. Yearwood then reached the top five of the country songs chart with "I Would've Loved You Anyway", the lead single from her number 1 studio album Inside Out (2001). She returned in 2005 with Jasper County, which certified gold in the United States and debuted at number 1 on the country albums chart. Following the release of her tenth studio record, Yearwood did not release new music until 2014's PrizeFighter: Hit After Hit. It debuted at number 7 on the country albums chart and featured six new songs. Her twelfth studio album and first with Garth Brooks debuted at number one on the Top Country Albums  list, Christmas Together (2016). Yearwood released a Frank Sinatra tribute album Let's Be Frank in 2019. This was followed by 2019's "Every Girl in This Town", which became Yearwood's highest-debuting single, charting at number 21 on the Billboard Country Airplay chart.

Albums

Studio albums

Compilation albums

Singles

As lead artist

As a featured artist

Promotional singles

Other charted songs

Videography

Video albums

Music videos

Music video guest appearances

Other appearances

Notes

References

External links 
 Trisha Yearwood's Official Website

Country music discographies
Discographies of American artists